This is a list of notable people who have or had motor neuron diseases, a group of rare neurodegenerative disorders that selectively affect motor neurons, the cells which control voluntary muscles of the body. This includes amyotrophic lateral sclerosis (ALS), progressive bulbar palsy (PBP), pseudobulbar palsy, progressive muscular atrophy (PMA), primary lateral sclerosis (PLS), spinal muscular atrophy (SMA) and monomelic amyotrophy (MMA), as well as some rarer variants resembling ALS.

Living

Ady Barkan (born 1983), American lawyer and political activist.
Jason Becker (born 1969), American musician, songwriter and composer.
Charlie Bird (born 1949), Irish journalist.
Jason Bowen (born 1972), Welsh footballer.
David Bradley (born 1954), American artist.
O. J. Brigance (born 1969), American football player.
Esteban Bullrich (born 1969), Argentine politician.
Rob Burrow (born 1982), English rugby league player.
Neale Daniher (born 1961), Australian rules footballer.
Stephen Darby (born 1988), English footballer.
Daniel L. Doctoroff (born 1958), American businessman and government official.
Roberta Flack (born 1937), American singer.
Yasuhiko Funago (born 1957), Japanese politician.
Steve Gleason (born 1977), American football player.
Kerry Goode (born 1965), American football player.
Tim Green (born 1963), American football player, commentator and author.
Frank Hansen (born 1952), American bobsledder.
John Driskell Hopkins (born 1971), American bassist (Zac Brown Band).
Mark Kirton (born 1958), Canadian ice hockey player.
George Kooymans (born 1948), Dutch musician (Golden Earring).
Euan MacDonald (born 1974), Scottish entrepreneur 
Steve McMichael (born 1957), American football player and professional wrestler.
Kenneth Mitchell (born 1974), Canadian actor.
Emanuel Morales (born 1987), Argentine footballer.
Jim Poole (born 1966), American baseball player.
Tim Shaw (born 1984), American football player.
Ed Slater (born 1988), English rugby union player.
Eric Stevens (born 1989), American football player.
Marcus Stewart (born 1972), English footballer.
Tempt One, American graffiti artist.
Kyousei Tsukui (born 1961), Japanese voice actor.
Juan Carlos Unzué (born 1967), Spanish footballer and manager.
Carl Webb (born 1981), Australian rugby league player.
Justin Yerbury (born 1974), Australian molecular biologist.
Moamen Zakaria (born 1988), Egyptian footballer.

Deceased
 

Eddie Adams (1933–2004), American photographer.
José Afonso (1929–1987), Portuguese singer-songwriter, revolutionist against the Estado Novo regime.
Gordon Aikman (1985–2017), British political researcher and motor neurone disease campaigner.
Frank Alamo (1941–2012), French singer.
Bruce Allpress (1930–2019), New Zealand actor.
Pietro Anastasi (1948–2020), Italian footballer.
Billy Anderson (1941–1996), American football player.
Hideyuki Ashihara (1944–1995), Japanese karate master.
Edda Heiðrún Backman (1957–2016), Icelandic actress.
Dale Baer (1950–2021), American animator.
Derek Bailey (1930–2005), English guitarist.
Victor Bailey (1960–2016), American bassist (Weather Report).
Katharine Balfour (1921–1990), American actress.
Marc Basnight (1947–2020), American politician.
Richard Beeman (1942–2016), American historian.
Mauril Bélanger (1955–2016), Canadian politician.
Emory Bellard (1927–2011), American college football coach.
Randall C. Berg Jr. (1949–2019), American attorney.
Giovanni Bertini (1951–2019), Italian footballer.
Nicholas Bianco (1932–1994), American mobster.
Ashley Bickerton (1959–2022), Barbadian-born American visual artist.
Stefano Borgonovo (1964–2013), Italian footballer
Jeff Bourne (1948–2014), English footballer.
Laurent Bouvet (1968–2021), French political scientist.
Michael Bowden (1947–2020), Australian footballer.
Fred Branfman (1942–2014), American anti-war activist and author.
Scott Brazil (1955–2006), American television producer.
Barbara Brenner (1951–2013), American health activist.
Donna Britt (1958–2021), American news anchor.
Harry Browne (1933–2006), American politician.
Jens Bullerjahn (1962–2022), German politician.
Heinz Burt (1942–2000), German-born British bassist and singer.
Ben Byer (1971–2008), American playwright, subject of the film Indestructible, documenting his life post-diagnosis.
Jeff Capel II (1953–2017), American basketball coach.
Linda Carlson (1945–2021), American actress.
Alicinha Cavalcanti (1962–2021), Brazilian event promoter.
Jane Cederqvist (1945–2023), Swedish Olympic swimmer.
Paul Cellucci (1948–2013), American politician and diplomat.
Ezzard Charles (1921–1975), American professional boxer.
Neil Cherry (1936–2003), New Zealand environmental scientist.
Marián Čišovský (1979–2020), Slovak footballer.
Dwight Clark (1957–2018), American football player.
Preston Cloud (1912–1991), American earth scientist.
Sammy Conn (1961–2014), Scottish footballer and manager.
Ronnie Corbett (1930–2016), Scottish comedian and actor.
John Coster-Mullen (1946–2021), American nuclear archaeologist.
John Curran (1953–2013), American financial journalist.
George Curry (1944–2016), American football coach.
Cyril Cusack (1910–1993), Irish actor.
Garth Dawley (1933–2020), Canadian journalist.
Dennis Day (1916–1988), American singer and actor.
Patrick Dean (1976–2021), American cartoonist.
Dieter Dengler (1938–2001), German-American aviator POW.
Papa Bouba Diop (1978–2020), Senegalese footballer.
Rickey Dixon (1966–2020), American football player.
Masayuki Dobashi (1935–2013), Japanese baseball player and manager.
Jim Dooley (1930–2008), American football player and coach.
Ann Downer (1960–2015), American author.
Jo-Anna Downey (1967–2016), Canadian comedian.
Brad Drewett (1958–2013), Australian tennis player and sports administrator.
John Drury (1927–2007), American news anchor.
Richard Ellman (1918–1987), American literary critic.
Cai Emmons (1951–2023), American author.
Sam English (1908–1967), Northern Irish footballer.
Jenifer Estess (1963–2003), American theatre producer and activist, subject of HBO film Jennifer; founding member of Project ALS.
Richard J. Ferris (1936–2022), American businessman.
Rose Finn-Kelcey (1945–2014), British artist.
Anto Finnegan (1973–2021), Northern Irish Gaelic footballer.
Hal Finney (1956–2014), American computer scientist.
Jay S. Fishman (1952–2016), American business executive.
Simon Fitzmaurice (1973–2017), Irish film director.
Roberto Fontanarrosa (1944–2007), Argentine cartoonist, comics artist and writer.
Phil Freelon (1953–2019), American architect.
Adam Kelso Fulton (1929-1994), Scottish rugby union player. 
Lou Gehrig (1903–1941), American baseball player.
Vic Gilliam (1953–2020), American politician.
Richard Glatzer (1952–2015), American film director and screenwriter.
Nina Griscom (1954–2020), American model and television host.
Stanislav Gross (1969–2015), Czech politician, Prime Minister of the Czech Republic.
Ingrid Hafner (1936–1994), British actress.
David Hagen (1973–2020), Scottish footballer.
Darryl Hammond (1967–2017), American football player.
Stephen Hawking (1942–2018), English theoretical physicist.
Mo Hayder (1962–2021), British author.
Toshiko Hayashi (1940–2022), Japanese politician.
Tony Hendra (1941–2021), British comedian and actor.
Hermann of Reichenau (1013–1054), German Benedictine monk and scholar.
Pierce Higgins (1977–2023), Irish hurler.
Stephen Hillenburg (1961–2018), American animator, creator of SpongeBob SquarePants.
Jeremy Hindley (1944–2013), British horse trainer.
Bob Holman (1936–2016), British academic.
Alexis Hunter (1948–2014), New Zealand painter and photographer.
Catfish Hunter (1946–1999), American baseball player.
Giancarlo Ibarguen (1963–2016), Guatemalan businessman and academic.
Tunch Ilkin (1957–2021), Turkish-American football player and broadcaster.
Mick Imlah (1956–2009), Scottish poet.
Tari Ito (1951–2021), Japanese performance artist.
Jacob Javits (1904–1986), American politician.
Axel Jensen (1932–2003), Norwegian author.
Derrick Jensen (1956–2017), American football player.
Lenny Johnrose (1969–2022), English footballer.
Tony Judt (1948–2010), British-American historian.
Gordon Kannegiesser (1945–2022), Canadian ice hockey player.
Novy Kapadia (1952–2021), Indian football journalist.
Jaan Kaplinski (1941–2021), Estonian author, translator, philosopher, and culture critic.
Yuzo Kawashima (1918–1963), Japanese film director.
Norman Kay (1929–2001), British composer.
George Keiser (1946–2021), American politician.
Hans Keller (1919–1985), Austrian-born British musician and writer.
Khaled Khan (1958–2013), Bangladeshi actor.
Shahidul Islam Khokon (1957–2016), Bangladeshi filmmaker.
Motoo Kimura (1924–1994), Japanese biologist.
Suna Kıraç (1941–2020), Turkish-American businesswoman.
Mark R. Kravitz (1950–2012), American judge.
Harry Kroto (1939–2016), English chemist.
Mike Kullman (1962–2003), American football player.
Jean-Yves Lafesse (1957–2021), French humorist and actor.
Hannu Lahtinen (1960–2020), Finnish wrestler.
John Land (1938–2021), British field hockey player.
Gary LaPaille (1954–2022), American politician.
Lead Belly (1888–1949), American singer.
Scott Lew  (1968–2017), American film director and screenwriter.
Stefan Lindqvist (1967–2020), Swedish footballer.
Tinus Linee (1969–2014), South African rugby player.
Tony Liscio (1940–2017), American football player.
Eric Lowen (1951-2012), American musician (Lowen & Navarro)
Klemens Ludwig (1955–2022), German astrologist.
Rebecca Luker (1961–2020), American actress and singer.
Antoine "T.C.D." Lundy (1963–1998), American musician (Force MDs).
Francisco Luzón (1948–2021), Spanish banker.
Brenda MacGibbon (1944–2022), Canadian mathematician.
David MacLennan (1948–2014), Scottish actor.
Pave Maijanen (1950–2021), Finnish musician.
Sergei Mandreko (1971–2022), Russian-Tajik footballer.
Tu'u Maori (1988–2022), Papua New Guinean rugby league player.
Mickey Marvin (1955–2017), American football player.
Scott Matzka (1978–2018), American ice hockey player.
Nicky McFadden (1962–2014), Irish politician.
Mike McGlinchey (1944–1997), American college football coach.
Fred McNeill (1952–2015), American football player.
Jim McMullan (1936–2019), American actor.
David McSkimming (1950–2016), Australian pianist.
Mark Merlis (1950-2017), American writer and health policy analyst.
Denny Miller (1934–2014), American actor.
Sherron Mills (1971–2016), American basketball player.
Charles Mingus (1922–1979), American jazz composer and bandleader.
Kyle Morrell (1963–2020), American football player.
Matthew Saad Muhammad (1954–2014), American boxer.
Colm Murray (1952–2013), Irish broadcaster.
Dawn Clark Netsch (1926–2013), American politician.
Arch Nicholson (1941–1990), Australian film director.
Augie Nieto (1958–2023), American entrepreneur, founder of Life Fitness.
David Niven (1910–1983), British actor.
Krzysztof Nowak (1975-2005), Polish footballer.
Pablo Olivares (1965–2014), Spanish film writer and producer.
Juan Carlos Orellana (1955–2022), Chilean footballer.
Carlos Pacheco (1961–2022), Spanish comic book artist.
Neon Park (1940–1993), American artist.
Aleksandar Petrović (1959–2014), Serbian basketball coach.
Ricardo Piglia (1941–2017), Argentine author.
Scott Pilarz (1959–2021), American academic administrator.
Christopher Pitchford (1947–2017), British judge.
Polly Platt (1939–2011), American production designer and film producer.
Mike Porcaro (1955–2015), American musician (Toto).
Boris Powell (1964–2022), American boxer.
Sergei Eduardovich Prikhodko (1957–2021), Russian diplomat and government official, former deputy prime minister (2013–2018).
Anton Pronk (1941–2016), Dutch footballer.
Patrick Quinn (1983–2020), American co-founder of the Ice Bucket Challenge
James C. Renick (1948–2021), American academic administrator.
Don Revie (1927–1989), English footballer and manager.
Fernando Ricksen (1976–2019), Dutch footballer.
Tommy Robson (1944–2020), English footballer.
Sue Rodriguez (1950–1994), Canadian right to die activist.
Benet Rossell (1937–2016), Spanish artist.
Stanley Sadie (1930–2005), English musicologist.
Tetsurō Sagawa (1937–2021), Japanese actor.
Börje Salming (1951–2022), Swedish ice hockey player.
Washington César Santos (1960–2014), Brazilian footballer.
Mike Schwartz (1950–2013), American anti-abortion activist.

Morrie Schwartz (1916–1995), American sociology professor, subject of Tuesdays with Morrie.
Peter Scott-Morgan, (1957–2022), English-American scientist.
Kim Shattuck (1963–2019), American singer and songwriter (The Muffs).
Luton Shelton (1985–2021), Jamaican footballer.
Sam Shepard (1943–2017), American actor and playwright.
Michael Shute (1951–2020), Canadian academic.
Gianluca Signorini (1960–2002), Italian footballer.
Keith Skillen (1948–2013), English footballer.
Thomas Sleeper (1956–2022), American conductor.
Lane Smith (1936–2005), American actor.
Steve Smith (1964–2021), American football player.
Michael Soles (1966–2021), Canadian football player.
Jadranka Stojaković (1950–2016), Bosnian singer.
Jon Stone (1931–1997), American television writer.
Ezra Swerdlow (1953–2018), American film producer.
Jim Thistle (1955–2016), Canadian politician. Additionally, he held office as both the Deputy Minister of Justice and Deputy Attorney General of Newfoundland and Labrador during his career.
Orlando Thomas (1972–2014), American football player.
Robin Thomas (1962–2020), Czech-American mathematician.
Stacy Title (1964–2021), American director, screenwriter and producer.
Dan Toler (1948–2013), American guitarist.
David Tomassoni (1952–2022), American politician.
Francis Tsai (1967–2015), American comic book artist.
Kevin Turner (1969–2016), American football player.
Dmitri Vasilenko (1975–2019), Russian gymnast.
Angelo Venosa (1954–2022), Brazilian sculptor.
Roy Walford (1924–2004), American pathologist.
Robert Webber (1924–1989), American actor.
Charlie Wedemeyer (1946–2010), American high school teacher and football coach.
Paul C. Weiler (1939–2021), Canadian lawyer and professor.
Irv Weinstein (1930–2017), American news anchor.
Doddie Weir (1970–2022), Scottish rugby union player.
Joost van der Westhuizen (1971–2017), South African rugby union player.
William White (1966–2022), American football player.
Mitch Wilson (1962–2019), Canadian ice hockey player.
Baron Wolman (1937–2020), American photographer.
Rocky Wood (1959–2014), New Zealand-Australian writer.
Lynn Wright (1952–2022), American politician.
Robert C. Wright (1944–2014), American politician.
George Yardley (1928–2004), American basketball player.
Marius Žaliūkas (1983–2020), Lithuanian footballer 
Mao Zedong (1893–1976), Chinese leader.

References

Lists of people by medical condition
Amyotrophic lateral sclerosis
+